Los Angeles (Maywood) Assembly was a Chrysler assembly plant located in the City of Commerce, near Maywood in southeastern Los Angeles County, California. It was an assembly location where vehicles were shipped by railroad in "knock-down kits" from Detroit, where they were locally assembled, combined with locally sourced parts. Vehicles assembled at Maywood were largely sold in California and the Western United States. It operated from 1932 until 1971, at 5800 Eastern Avenue and Slauson Boulevard. 

The Ford Maywood Assembly Plant was across the street and began operations in 1948. GM later opened the South Gate Assembly further south in 1936.

Production
In 1932 the Los Angeles Assembly manufactured Dodge and Plymouth trucks. During World War II the plant switched to war production, manufacturing over 40,000 aircraft engines, as well as Boeing B-17 Flying Fortress and Lockheed PV-2 cabin tops.

Automobiles
Chrysler Corporation automobile divisions that were assembled here were:
 Plymouth 1932-1964
 Dodge 1946-1964
 DeSoto 1932-1959
 Chrysler 1948-1960
Automobiles models assembled here include:
 Plymouth Valiant 1960-1971
 Dodge Lancer 1960-1962
 Plymouth Barracuda 1964-1966, 1969-1970
 Dodge Challenger 1969-1970
 Plymouth Belvedere 1964-1971
 Dodge Coronet 1964-1971

San Leandro Assembly
From 1948 until the factory was sold and production ended in 1954, Plymouth and Dodge passenger cars were built at 1933 Davis Street, San Leandro, CA. The plant was briefly listed as a parts plant until it was sold to International Harvester in the 1960s where they built Class 8 semi tractors then sold to Caterpillar in 1975. It is currently the location of Westgate Shopping Center.

See also
List of Chrysler factories

References

External links
Allpar.com Chrysler Los Angeles Assembly
Laalmanac.com: List of Southern California automobile plants
CJ3a.info: Chrysler Maywood Assembly
Los Angeles' Lost Auto Factories

Chrysler factories
Motor vehicle assembly plants in California
Manufacturing companies based in Greater Los Angeles
Commerce, California
Maywood, California
Buildings and structures in Los Angeles County, California
1932 establishments in California
1971 disestablishments in California
Vehicle manufacturing companies established in 1932
Vehicle manufacturing companies disestablished in 1971
Defunct companies based in Greater Los Angeles